Marinococcus  is a Gram-positive, strictly aerobic, chemolithoautotrophic and non-spore-forming genus of bacteria from the family of Bacillaceae.

References

Further reading 
 
 
 
 
 
 

 

Bacillaceae
Bacteria genera